The 2009 Portuguese legislative election was held on 27 September, to renew all 230 members of the Assembly of the Republic. The Socialist Party, led by incumbent Prime Minister José Sócrates, won the largest number of seats, but didn't repeat the overall majority they gained in 2005.

The Socialist Party of Prime Minister José Sócrates came in first despite losing 9% of the vote and 24 seats.

In these elections there were approximately 9.5 million Portuguese at home and abroad called to determine the 230 seats in the Assembleia da República and 18th constitutional government in Portugal after 1976. The Socialists won the election with a clear lead over the conservative Social Democrats, with big gains for the People's Party and for the Left Bloc.

The election took place during the regular end of the previous four-year legislative period. From 2005 to 2009 ruled by the Socialist Party (PS), led by José Sócrates, with an absolute majority. The opinion polls at the beginning of the official election campaign on 12 September 2009, showed a too close to call race between the Socialists and the conservative Social Democrats, but just days before the election the Socialists increased their lead over the Social Democrats. A total of 13 parties and two coalitions competed in this election.

Focus of the campaign was the impact of global economic, the financial crisis and the construction of new infrastructure projects, including the high-speed rail link Lisbon-Madrid and Lisbon-Porto-Vigo, and the new Lisbon airport.

Neither of the two major parties won an absolute majority in the Assembly of the Republic, so, the future prime minister had to form a coalition, or at least rely on other parties to govern. In that case, José Sócrates was in a better position than Manuela Ferreira Leite, since the Portuguese left won by 54.23% of the vote and 128 seats, against 39.54% and 102 deputies to the right.

On 12 October, José Sócrates was invited by President Aníbal Cavaco Silva to form government. The new cabinet was announced on 22 October and sworn in on 26 October.

Voter turnout was one of the lowest in Portuguese election history, as 59.7% of the electorate cast a ballot.

Background 
In the February 2005 early elections, the Socialists, under the leadership of José Sócrates, won 45% of the votes and 121 MPs, the 1st time the Socialists won a majority and the 1st time a single party won a majority since Cavaco Silva's PSD victory in 1991. The PSD suffered a heavy defeat, achieving their worst results since 1983, and faced with this failure, the then PSD leader and outgoing Prime Minister, Pedro Santana Lopes, resigned from the leadership and called an election for party chair.

During the first months in his government, Sócrates raised taxes to cut the deficit and initiated a policy of strict budgetary rigor. At the same time, he faced a very harsh summer with Wildfires across the country. That same October, the Socialists suffered a heavy defeat in the 2005 local elections, winning just 108 cities, a drop of 4, against the PSD's 158 mayoral holds. The PS was also unable to retake control of Lisbon and Porto. In January 2006, a new president was elected. Aníbal Cavaco Silva, PM between 1985 and 1995, became the first center-right candidate to win a presidential election, although only just. The PS candidate, former PM and President Mário Soares polled a disappointing third place with just 14% of the votes. In 2007, a referendum for the legalization of abortion was held. After the failure of the 1998 referendum, the Yes side prevailed winning 59% of the votes against the No's 41%, making abortion legal in Portugal.

While the deficit reduction had been successful, and with the economy growing above 2% of GDP, the government faced heavy opposition for its policies, particularly from teachers unions. In March 2008, more than 100,000 teachers protested in Lisbon against Sócrates and his Education minister, Maria de Lurdes Rodrigues.

Entering 2009, Portugal was strongly hit by the effects of the financial crisis that was shaking the global economy, and, therefore, the country entered in a recession. As a result, the government adopted stimulus measures that worsened the public finances and increased the deficit and the debt. In the European elections of June 7, 2009, the PSD stunned pundits by winning a European election for the first time since 1989, with 31.7% of the votes. The Socialists suffered a huge defeat, winning just 26% of the votes, a drop of 18%.

Leadership changes

PSD 2005 leadership election
In the party's congress in April 2005, Luís Marques Mendes became party leader winning 56% of the delegates, against the 44% of his rival, Luís Filipe Menezes. The results were the following:

|- style="background-color:#E9E9E9"
! align="center" colspan=2 style="width:  60px"|Candidate
! align="center" style="width:  50px"|Votes
! align="center" style="width:  50px"|%
|-
|bgcolor=orange|
| align=left | Luís Marques Mendes
| align=right | 497
| align=right | 56.6
|-
|bgcolor=orange|
| align=left | Luís Filipe Menezes
| align=right | 381
| align=right | 43.4
|-
|- style="background-color:#E9E9E9"
| colspan=2 style="text-align:left;" |   Turnout
| align=right | 878
| align=center | 
|-
| colspan="4" align=left|Source: 
|}

CDS–PP 2005 leadership election
CDS–PP leader Paulo Portas, resigned from the leadership following the disappointing result of the party in the 2005 elections saying that "in no civilized country in the world, the difference between Trotskyists and Christian Democrats is one percent", referring to the result of the BE. A snap leadership congress was called to elect a new leader. Two candidates were in the ballot: Telmo Correia, the preferred candidate of Paulo Portas, and José Ribeiro e Castro, more critical of Portas. Ribeiro e Castro was easily elected and the results were the following:

|- style="background-color:#E9E9E9"
! align="center" colspan=2 style="width:  60px"|Candidate
! align="center" style="width:  50px"|Votes
! align="center" style="width:  50px"|%
|-
|bgcolor=|
| align=left | José Ribeiro e Castro
| align=right | 492
| align=right | 56.0
|-
|bgcolor=|
| align=left | Telmo Correia
| align=right | 387
| align=right | 44.0
|-
|- style="background-color:#E9E9E9"
| colspan=2 style="text-align:left;" |   Turnout
| align=right | 879
| align=center | 
|-
| colspan="4" align=left|Source: 
|}

CDS–PP 2007 leadership election
In April 2007, former CDS–PP leader Paulo Portas challenged the then party leader, José Ribeiro e Castro, for the leadership and was elected for his former job by a landslide. The results were the following:

|- style="background-color:#E9E9E9"
! align="center" colspan=2 style="width:  60px"|Candidate
! align="center" style="width:  50px"|Votes
! align="center" style="width:  50px"|%
|-
|bgcolor=|
| align=left | Paulo Portas
| align=right | 5,642
| align=right | 74.6
|-
|bgcolor=|
| align=left | José Ribeiro e Castro
| align=right | 1,883
| align=right | 24.9
|-
| colspan=2 align=left | Blank/Invalid ballots
| align=right | 38
| align=right | 0.5
|-
|- style="background-color:#E9E9E9"
| colspan=2 style="text-align:left;" |   Turnout
| align=right | 7,563
| align=center | 
|-
| colspan="4" align=left|Source: 
|}

PSD 2007 leadership election

In the Social Democratic Party, incumbent leader Luís Marques Mendes was being very criticized for his opposition strategy and was left weakened after the PSD disappointing result in the 2007 Lisbon mayoral by-election, where the PSD polled 3rd with less than 16% of the votes. Marques Mendes called a snap leadership election and was challenged by his rival in the 2005 PSD congress, Luís Filipe Menezes. Menezes easily defeated Marques Mendes. The results were the following:

|- style="background-color:#E9E9E9"
! align="center" colspan=2 style="width:  60px"|Candidate
! align="center" style="width:  50px"|Votes
! align="center" style="width:  50px"|%
|-
|bgcolor=orange|
| align=left | Luís Filipe Menezes
| align=right | 21,101
| align=right | 53.6
|-
|bgcolor=orange|
| align=left | Luís Marques Mendes
| align=right | 16,973
| align=right | 43.1
|-
| colspan=2 align=left | Blank/Invalid ballots
| align=right | 1,279
| align=right | 3.3
|-
|- style="background-color:#E9E9E9"
| colspan=2 style="text-align:left;" |   Turnout
| align=right | 39,353
| align=right | 62.42
|-
| colspan="4" align=left|Source: 
|}

PSD 2008 leadership election

The then PSD leader, Luís Filipe Menezes, elected in September 2007, resigned after just 6 months in the job. In the following leadership elections, held in May 2008, Manuela Ferreira Leite became the first woman to lead a major party in Portugal, winning 38% of the votes, against the 31% of Pedro Passos Coelho and the 30% of Pedro Santana Lopes. The results were the following:

|- style="background-color:#E9E9E9"
! align="center" colspan=2 style="width:  60px"|Candidate
! align="center" style="width:  50px"|Votes
! align="center" style="width:  50px"|%
|-
|bgcolor=orange|
| align=left | Manuela Ferreira Leite
| align=right | 17,278
| align=right | 37.9
|-
|bgcolor=orange|
| align=left | Pedro Passos Coelho
| align=right | 14,160
| align=right | 31.1
|-
|bgcolor=orange|
| align=left | Pedro Santana Lopes
| align=right | 13,495
| align=right | 29.6
|-
|bgcolor=orange|
| align=left | Patinha Antão
| align=right | 308
| align=right | 0.7
|-
| colspan=2 align=left | Blank/Invalid ballots
| align=right | 351
| align=right | 0.8
|-
|- style="background-color:#E9E9E9"
| colspan=2 style="text-align:left;" |   Turnout
| align=right| 45,592
| align=right | 59.13
|-
| colspan="4" align=left|Source: 
|}

Electoral system 

The Assembly of the Republic has 230 members elected to four-year terms. Governments do not require absolute majority support of the Assembly to hold office, as even if the number of opposers of government is larger than that of the supporters, the number of opposers still needs to be equal or greater than 116 (absolute majority) for both the Government's Programme to be rejected or for a motion of no confidence to be approved.

The number of seats assigned to each district depends on the district magnitude. The use of the d'Hondt method makes for a higher effective threshold than certain other allocation methods such as the Hare quota or Sainte-Laguë method, which are more generous to small parties.

For these elections, and compared with the 2005 elections, the MPs distributed by districts were the following:

Parties
The table below lists the parties represented in the Assembly of the Republic during the 10th legislature (2005–2009) and that also partook in the election:

Campaign period

Party slogans

Candidates' debates

Opinion polling

Results

National summary

|- 
| colspan=11| 
|-  
! rowspan="2" colspan=2 style="background-color:#E9E9E9;text-align:left;" alignleft|Parties
! rowspan="2" style="background-color:#E9E9E9;text-align:right;" |Votes
! rowspan="2" style="background-color:#E9E9E9;text-align:right;" |%
! rowspan="2" style="background-color:#E9E9E9;text-align:right;" |±pp swing
! colspan="5" style="background-color:#E9E9E9;text-align:center;" |MPs
! rowspan="2" style="background-color:#E9E9E9;text-align:right;" |MPs %/votes %
|- style="background-color:#E9E9E9"
! style="background-color:#E9E9E9;text-align:center;" |2005
! style="background-color:#E9E9E9;text-align:center;" |2009
! style="background-color:#E9E9E9;text-align:right;" |±
! style="background-color:#E9E9E9;text-align:right;" |%
! style="background-color:#E9E9E9;text-align:right;" |±
|-
| 
|2,077,238||36.56||8.4||121||97||24||42.17||10.4||1.15
|-
| 
|1,653,665||29.11||0.3||71||81||10||35.22||4.3||1.21
|-
| 
|592,778||10.43||3.1||12||21||9||9.13||3.9||0.88
|-  
| 
|557,306||9.81||3.4||8||16||8||6.96||3.5||0.71
|-
| 
|446,279||7.86||0.3||14||15||1||6.52||0.4||0.83
|-
| 
|52,761||0.93||0.1||0||0||0||0.00||0.0||0.0
|-
| 
|25,949||0.46||||||0||||0.00||||0.0
|-
| 
|21,876||0.38||0.3||0||0||0||0.00||0.0||0.0
|-
| 
|16,924||0.30||||||0||||0.00||||0.0
|-
| 
|15,262||0.27||||2||0||2||0.00||0.9||0.0
|-
| style="width:10px;background-color:#013220;text-align:center;" | 
| style="text-align:left;" |Ecology and Humanism Front 
|12,405||0.22||||||0||||0.00||||0.0
|-
| 
|11,503||0.20||0.0||0||0||0||0.00||0.0||0.0
|-
| style="width:10px;background-color:#000080;text-align:center;" | 
| style="text-align:left;" |Portugal Pro-Life
|8,461||0.15||||||0||||0.00||||0.0
|-
|style="width: 10px" bgcolor=#CC0033 align="center" | 
|align=left|Labour
|4,974||0.09||||||0||||0.00||||0.0
|-
| 
|4,632||0.08||0.0||0||0||0||0.00||0.0||0.0
|-
| 
|3,265||0.06||||2||0||2||0.00||0.9||0.0
|-
|colspan=2 style="text-align:left;background-color:#E9E9E9"|Total valid 
|width="65" style="text-align:right;background-color:#E9E9E9"|5,505,278
|width="40" style="text-align:right;background-color:#E9E9E9"|96.91
|width="40" style="text-align:right;background-color:#E9E9E9"|0.2
|width="40" style="text-align:right;background-color:#E9E9E9"|230
|width="40" style="text-align:right;background-color:#E9E9E9"|230
|width="40" style="text-align:right;background-color:#E9E9E9"|0
|width="40" style="text-align:right;background-color:#E9E9E9"|100.00
|width="40" style="text-align:right;background-color:#E9E9E9"|0.0
|width="40" style="text-align:right;background-color:#E9E9E9"|—
|-
|colspan=2|Blank ballots
|99,086||1.74||0.1||colspan=6 rowspan=4|
|-
|colspan=2|Invalid ballots
|76,894||1.35||0.2
|-
|colspan=2 style="text-align:left;background-color:#E9E9E9"|Total 
|width="65" style="text-align:right;background-color:#E9E9E9"|5,681,258
|width="40" style="text-align:right;background-color:#E9E9E9"|100.00
|width="40" style="text-align:right;background-color:#E9E9E9"|
|-
|colspan=2|Registered voters/turnout
||9,519,921||59.68||4.6
|-
| colspan=11 style="text-align:left;" | Source: Comissão Nacional de Eleições

Distribution by constituency

|- class="unsortable"
!rowspan=2|Constituency!!%!!S!!%!!S!!%!!S!!%!!S!!%!!S
!rowspan=2|TotalS
|- class="unsortable" style="text-align:center;"
!colspan=2 | PS
!colspan=2 | PSD
!colspan=2 | CDS–PP
!colspan=2 | BE
!colspan=2 | CDU
|-
| style="text-align:left;" | Azores
| style="background:; color:white;"|39.7
| 3
| 35.7
| 2
| 10.3
| -
| 7.3
| -
| 2.2
| -
| 5
|-
| style="text-align:left;" | Aveiro
| 33.8
| 6
| style="background:; color:white;"|34.6
| 7
| 13.0
| 2
| 9.0
| 1
| 3.8
| -
| 16
|-
| style="text-align:left;" | Beja
| style="background:; color:white;"|34.9
| 2
| 14.6
| -
| 5.7
| -
| 10.0
| -
| 29.1
| 1
| 3
|-
| style="text-align:left;" | Braga
| style="background:; color:white;"|41.7
| 9
| 30.8
| 6
| 9.7
| 2
| 7.8
| 1
| 4.6
| 1
| 19
|-
| style="text-align:left;" | Bragança
| 33.0
| 1
| style="background:; color:white;"|40.6
| 2
| 12.6
| -
| 6.2
| -
| 2.4
| -
| 3
|-
| style="text-align:left;" | Castelo Branco
| style="background:; color:white;"|41.0
| 2
| 29.8
| 2
| 8.4
| -
| 9.1
| -
| 5.1
| -
| 4
|-
| style="text-align:left;" | Coimbra
| style="background:; color:white;"|38.0
| 4
| 30.6
| 4
| 8.8
| 1
| 10.8
| 1
| 5.7
| -
| 10
|-
| style="text-align:left;" | Évora
| style="background:; color:white;"|35.0
| 1
| 19.0
| 1
| 6.4
| -
| 11.1
| -
| 22.3
| 1
| 3
|-
| style="text-align:left;" | Faro
| style="background:; color:white;"|31.9
| 3
| 26.2
| 3
| 10.7
| 1
| 15.3
| 1
| 7.8
| -
| 8
|-
| style="text-align:left;" | Guarda
| style="background:; color:white;"|36.0
| 2
| 35.6
| 2
| 11.2
| -
| 7.6
| -
| 3.3
| -
| 4
|-
| style="text-align:left;" | Leiria
| 30.1
| 4
| style="background:; color:white;"|34.9
| 4
| 12.6
| 1
| 9.5
| 1
| 5.1
| -
| 10
|-
| style="text-align:left;" | Lisbon
| style="background:; color:white;"|36.4
| 19
| 25.1
| 13
| 11.0
| 5
| 10.8
| 5
| 9.9
| 5
| 47
|-
| style="text-align:left;" | Madeira
| 19.4
| 1
| style="background:; color:white;"|48.1
| 4
| 11.1
| 1
| 6.2
| -
| 4.2
| -
| 6
|-
| style="text-align:left;" | Portalegre
| style="background:; color:white;"|38.3
| 1
| 23.8
| 1
| 8.0
| -
| 10.8
| -
| 12.9
| -
| 2
|-
| style="text-align:left;" | Porto
| style="background:; color:white;"|41.8
| 18
| 29.2
| 12
| 9.3
| 4
| 9.2
| 3
| 5.7
| 2
| 39
|-
| style="text-align:left;" | Santarém
| style="background:; color:white;"|33.7
| 4
| 27.0
| 3
| 11.2
| 1
| 11.8
| 1
| 9.2
| 1
| 10
|-
| style="text-align:left;" | Setúbal
| style="background:; color:white;"|34.0
| 7
| 16.4
| 3
| 9.1
| 1
| 14.0
| 2
| 20.1
| 4
| 17
|-
| style="text-align:left;" | Viana do Castelo
| style="background:; color:white;"|36.3
| 3
| 31.3
| 2
| 13.6
| 1
| 8.6
| -
| 4.2
| -
| 6
|-
| style="text-align:left;" | Vila Real
| 36.1
| 2
| style="background:; color:white;"|41.1
| 3
| 10.1
| -
| 5.5
| -
| 2.9
| -
| 5
|-
| style="text-align:left;" | Viseu
| 34.7
| 4
| style="background:; color:white;"|37.5
| 4
| 13.4
| 1
| 6.5
| -
| 2.9
| -
| 9
|-
| style="text-align:left;" | Europe
| style="background:; color:white;"|43.3
| 1
| 23.8
| 1
| 4.7
| -
| 4.7
| -
| 4.4
| -
| 2
|-
| style="text-align:left;" | Outside Europe
| 22.0
| -
| style="background:; color:white;"|54.5
| 2
| 3.2
| -
| 2.0
| -
| 1.0
| -
| 2
|-
|- class="unsortable" style="background:#E9E9E9"
| style="text-align:left;" | Total
| style="background:; color:white;"|36.6
| 97
| 29.1
| 81
| 10.4
| 21
| 9.8
| 16
| 7.9
| 15
| 230
|-
| colspan=12 style="text-align:left;" | Source: Comissão Nacional de Eleições

Maps

Notes

References

External links 
 Preliminary results of the 2009 election
 Portuguese Electoral Commission

See also
 Politics of Portugal
 List of political parties in Portugal
 Elections in Portugal

2009 elections in Portugal
2009 legislative
September 2009 events in Europe